Holly Bush railway station served the village of Hollybush, in the historical county of Monmouthshire, Wales, from 1871 to 1960 on the Sirhowy Railway.

History 
The station was opened in August 1871 by the Sirhowy Railway, although it was advertised earlier for Blackwood Gala and Picnic on 14 May 1866 and in May 1867; it appeared as Holly Bush in these. It was resited and reused on 31 August 1891 but it opened as Hollybush. Its name was changed to Holly Bush on 1 December 1899. It closed on 13 June 1960.

References 

Disused railway stations in Caerphilly County Borough
Former London and North Western Railway stations
Railway stations in Great Britain opened in 1871
Railway stations in Great Britain closed in 1960
1871 establishments in Wales
1960 disestablishments in Wales